U8 may refer to:

 U8 (Berlin U-Bahn), a line on the Berlin U-Bahn
 U8 Global Student Partnership for Development
 German submarine U-8, one of several German submarines
 the IATA code for Armavia airline
 another designation for the Beechcraft L-23 Seminole
 Ultima VIII: Pagan, a video game
 u8, a name for the 8-bit unsigned integer, especially in Rust